Parthenicus is a genus of plant bugs in the family Miridae. There are at least 70 described species in Parthenicus.

See also
 List of Parthenicus species

References

 Thomas J. Henry, Richard C. Froeschner. (1988). Catalog of the Heteroptera, True Bugs of Canada and the Continental United States. Brill Academic Publishers.

Further reading

External links

 NCBI Taxonomy Browser, Parthenicus

Miridae genera
Orthotylini